Sungai Buloh, or Sungei Buloh, is a town, a mukim (commune) and a parliamentary constituency in the northern part of Petaling District, Selangor, Malaysia. The name itself means bamboo river in the Malay language. It is located 16 km NW of downtown Kuala Lumpur and 8 km north of the Subang Airport, along the Kuala Selangor highway.

Bordering Damansara, Kepong, Kuang and Kuala Selangor, Sungai Buloh is notable for its colonial-era leper colony, one of the largest in the country.

History
No clear historical records regarding Sungai Buloh's founding and settlement were available, though railway services had reached Sungai Buloh by the 1890s.

Many believe that Sungai Buloh got its name from Sungai Buloh river that flows from Strait of Malacca through Kuala Selangor District. A town in Jeram in Kuala Selangor where the estuary of Sungai Buloh begins was also named after the river.

In 1930, in an isolated valley of Bukit Lagong, Sungai Buloh, a group of Malays, Chinese, Indians, Eurasians and Turks set up a contained community in the wake of the 1926 Leper Enactment Act, which required the segregation and treatment of those with the disease.

Sungai Buloh was at one point, the second biggest leprosy settlement in the world. It was equipped with advanced facilities and remained a research centre for leprosy until today. Sungei Buloh was a pioneer project based on the "enlightened policy" of segregating leprosy patients in a self-supporting community following the principles of a garden city.

In 1935 and 1936, scrip (voucher) was issued specifically for the settlement.

Sungai Buloh was the site of the Bright Sparklers Firework factory explosion in May 1991 and the subsequent fire.

Geography

Location and geographical definition
Sungai Buloh is located at the northern quarter of the Petaling Region, bordering Damansara, Subang, Kuang and Kepong (across the Selangor-Federal Territory border).

Neighbourhoods and residential areas of Sungai Buloh include:
 Bukit Rahman Putra
 Damansara Damai
 Bandar Sri Damansara
 Bandar Baru Sungai Buloh
 Paya Jaras
 Desa Aman
 Kwasa Damansara
 Taman Villa Putra
 Sierramas
 Valencia
 Aman Putri

Most of these neighbourhoods are guarded and gated to provide the safest hospitality for the residents. Though often included as part of Sungai Buloh, the wards of Matang Pagar, Bandar Saujana Utama and Bandar Seri Coalfields, are actually part of the neighbouring towns of Kuang and Kuala Selangor respectively. The nearby township of Kota Damansara, though rarely included as part of Sungai Buloh, falls under the same parliamentary constituency as Sungai Buloh itself.

Education
There are currently three public high schools in Sungai Buloh – SMK Bandar Baru Sungai Buloh, SMK Bukit Rahman Putra and SMK Sierramas. Sungai Buloh also houses two international schools, namely IGB International School, behind the railway/metro station, and elc International School, in Sierramas.

Accessibility

Public transport
 Sungai Buloh railway station is the main railway station serving the town with services by the  KTM Komuter Port Klang Line and the  Putrajaya line. Limited  KTM ETS high speed rail services are also available.

Car
The Kepong-Kuala Selangor highway Federal Route 54 runs through Sungai Buloh area, intersecting with Federal Route 15 (to Subang Airport and Subang Jaya). North–South Expressway Northern Route exit 113 serves the city.

Governance

Local authority
Due to its unclear geographical definition, what is considered as Sungai Buloh, falls under jurisdiction of four local authorities:

 Majlis Bandaraya Shah Alam (Shah Alam City Council, MBSA), covering Bukit Rahman Putra, Kampung Baru Sungai Buloh, the Sungai Buloh military base, Paya Jaras, and Kwasa Damansara.
 Majlis Bandaraya Petaling Jaya (Petaling Jaya City Council, MBPJ), covering Kampung Selamat, Bandar Sri Damansara, Damansara Damai, and the railway/MRT station.
 Majlis Perbandaran Selayang (Selayang Municipal Council, MPS), covering Hospital Sungai Buloh, Valencia, Sierramas, Taman Matang Jaya and Taman Impian Indah and the Sungai Buloh Prison complex. Note that these locations are closer to, and often included as part of, Kuang, rather than Sungai Buloh.
 Majlis Perbandaran Kuala Selangor (Kuala Selangor Municipal Council, MPKS), covering some far western areas near Puncak Alam such as Bandar Saujana Utama and Bandar Seri Coalfields. These areas are technically not part of Sungai Buloh.

Politics
Sungai Buloh lends its name to, and is represented by the Sungai Buloh parliamentary constituency. The bulk of Sungai Buloh town is within the Paya Jaras state constituency, which is also one of two state seats in the parliamentary constituency; though part of the town also spills into neighbouring Selayang constituency.

See also
 Jerejak Island
 Kajang

References

 Sungai Buloh Selangor Facebook Group.

Populated places in Selangor
Petaling District
Mukims of Selangor